The 1937 Stanford Indians football team represented Stanford University in the 1937 college football season. The team was coached by Tiny Thornhill in his fifth season at Stanford and played their home games at Stanford Stadium in Stanford, California.

The team had been scheduled to play two games in Hawaii—against a Honolulu town team and the University of Hawaii—in December, but the games were canceled due to steamship schedule changes that meant the team would miss a week and a half of classes in winter quarter. Washington replaced Stanford at the last minute for both games.

Schedule

Game summaries

California
The Indians were 4–1–1 in the Pacific Coast Conference entering the Big Game against 5–0–1 California. A head-to-head win over the Bears would almost certainly have given Stanford a bid to the 1938 Rose Bowl. However, the Bears scored two touchdowns in quick succession in an eight-minute stretch of the second quarter and held the Indians scoreless, winning 13–0.

Columbia
Stanford faced Columbia for the third time in four years. The Indians had lost to the Lions in the 1934 Rose Bowl and lost in New York the previous season; this year, in what would be the final meeting of the teams, the teams played to a scoreless tie.

References

Stanford
Stanford Cardinal football seasons
Stanford Indians football